Leaves from a Child's Sketchbook is a set of three pieces for piano solo composed in 1918 by John Ireland.

A performance of all three pieces takes about 6½ minutes. Their titles are:

 By the Mere
 In the Meadow
 The Hunt's Up

References 

Solo piano pieces by John Ireland
1918 compositions